The 2006 NCAA Division I men's soccer tournament was a tournament of 48 teams from NCAA Division I who played for the NCAA Championship in soccer. The College Cup Final Four was held at Hermann Stadium in St. Louis, Missouri. All the other games were played at the home field of the higher-seeded team. The final was held on December 3, 2006. UC Santa Barbara, UCLA, Virginia, and Wake Forest made the Final Four. UC Santa Barbara beat Wake Forest and UCLA defeated Virginia. In the final UC Santa Barbara won the title game overcoming UCLA, 2–1.

The tournament started on November 10, 2006. The first round was played on November 10 and 11. The second round on the 15th, and the third round on the 18th and 19th. The Regional Finals were played on November 24–26.

Regional 1

Regional 2

Regional 3

Regional 4

College Cup – Hermann Stadium, St. Louis, Missouri

Results

First round

Second round

Third round

Quarterfinals

College Cup

Semifinals

Championship

Statistics

Goalscorers
5 goals

 Sal Zizzo — UCLA

4 goals

 Gerardo Alvarez — Northwestern
 David Estrada — UCLA

3 goals

 Andrew Daniels — Brown
 Eric Avila — UC Santa Barbara
 Nick Perera — UC Santa Barbara
 Tyler Rosenlund — UC Santa Barbara
 Adam Cristman — Virginia
 Yannick Reyering — Virginia
 Zack Schilawski — Wake Forest
 Kevin Forrest — Washington

2 goals

 Javier Ayala-Hil — California
 Mike Grella — Duke
 Michael Videira — Duke
 Spencer Wadsworth — Duke
 Michael Todd — Hofstra
 Brad North — Northwestern
 Joseph Lapira — Notre Dame
 Kurt Martin — Notre Dame
 Jason Leopoldo — UCLA
 Scott Jones — UNC Greensboro
 Steven Curfman — Wake Forest
 Marcus Tracy — Wake Forest

1 goal

 Rob Philippou — Adelphi
 Barry Neville — Binghamton
 Nick Elenz-Martin — Brown
 Mark Schmiegel — Bucknell
 Jeff Serafini — California
 Jacob Wilson — California
 Frederico Moojen — Clemson
 Bryson Moore — Clemson
 Dane Richards — Clemson
 Julius James — Connecticut
 Chris Loftus — Duke
 Jimmy Gaughan — Fairfield
 Christian Uy — Fairfield
 Richard Godfrey — Gardner-Webb
 Chris Salvaggione — Gardner-Webb
 Andre Akpan — Harvard
 Mike Fucito — Harvard
 Rory McCrea — Hofstra
 Eric Cervantes — Illinois-Chicago
 Pavle Dundjer — Illinois-Chicago
 Cesar Zambrano — Illinois-Chicago
 Brian Ackley — Indiana
 Adam Gazda — Lehigh
 Jeremy Hall — Maryland
 Graham Zusi — Maryland
 Stephen Brown — New Mexico
 Blake Danaher — New Mexico
 Justin McGrane — Northern Illinois
 David Roth — Northwestern
 Brian Usinger — Northwestern
 Trevor Banks — Old Dominion
 Ross MacKenzie — Old Dominion
 Jeffrey Gonsalves — Rhode Island
 Łukasz Tumicz — Rhode Island
 Nick LaBrocca — Rutgers
 Freddy McDonald — San Diego State
 Peter Lowry — Santa Clara
 Brian Martin — Santa Clara
 Babajide Ogunbiyi — Santa Clara
 Erik Ustruck — Santa Clara
 Scott Corbin — SMU
 Ryan Soroka — St. John's
 Nino Mangione — Towson
 Pat Healey — Towson
 Kevin Ruck — Towson
 Shane Elsner — UAB
 Bryan Byrne — UC Santa Barbara
 Andy Iro — UC Santa Barbara
 David Walker — UC Santa Barbara
 Chance Myers — UCLA
 Kyle Nakazawa — UCLA
 Michael Stephens — UCLA
 Thomas Campbell — UNC Greensboro
 Michael Fitzgerald — UNC Greensboro
 Randi Patterson — UNC Greensboro
 Nico Colaluca — Virginia
 Ian Holder — Virginia
 Jonathan Villanueva — Virginia
 Patrick Nyarko — Virginia Tech
 Sam Cronin — Wake Forest
 Michael Lahoud — Wake Forest
 Wells Thompson — Wake Forest
 Matt Fischer — Washington
 Steve Mohn — Washington
 Chris Wittig — West Virginia

References

Championship
NCAA Division I Men's Soccer Tournament seasons
NCAA Division I Mens Soccer
NCAA Division I men's soccer tournament
NCAA Division I men's soccer tournament
NCAA Division I men's soccer tournament